Ekattor (in reference to the 1971 War) is a Bangladeshi Bengali-language satellite and cable news television channel owned by the Meghna Group of Industries, commencing transmissions on 21 June 2012, as Bangladesh's first news-oriented television channel broadcasting in full HD. The channel broadcasts from its headquarters in the Sohrawardi Avenue of Baridhara.

Ownership 
After the change of political power in 2009, Mozammel Hossain sold half of the shares owned by himself and his relatives in the name of Mustafa Kamal and his one son and two daughters in Meghna Group.

History 
Ekattor received its broadcasting license from the Bangladesh Telecommunication Regulatory Commission, along with several other privately owned Bangladeshi television channels, on 20 October 2009. It was officially launched on 21 June 2012 by former chairman Fazlul Haque Khan, with its slogan being "Sangbad Noy Songjog" (সংবাদ নয় সংযোগ), as the fourth news-oriented television channel in Bangladesh. Ekattor was one of the nine Bangladeshi television channels to sign an agreement with Bdnews24.com to subscribe to a video-based news agency run by children called Prism in May 2016.

In July 2017, Ekattor, along with four other television channels in Bangladesh, signed an agreement with UNICEF to air children's programming for one minute. In December 2018, Ekattor began broadcasting using the Bangabandhu-1 satellite. On 13 August 2022, Ekattor broadcast a meeting regarding global energy crisis and the challenges of Bangladesh live.

Controversies and boycotts
In 2017, Ekattor's website was hacked by Islamists who demanded "atheist media" to halt all "anti-Islam" activities. Ekattor was accused of airing "anti-social" news reports and Nurul Haq Nur even called for a boycott of the channel in 2020, which was condemned by Editors Guild Bangladesh. Bangladeshi Islamic scholars, such as Mizanur Rahman Azhari, also called for a boycott of Ekattor as it was accused of airing anti-Islam content.

Programming
 Bishajog
 Deshjog
 Ekattor Journal
 Khelajog
 Songbad Songjog

See also 
 List of television stations in Bangladesh
 List of radio stations in Bangladesh

References

External links
 

Television channels in Bangladesh
Television channels and stations established in 2012
Mass media in Dhaka
2012 establishments in Bangladesh
24-hour television news channels in Bangladesh